Francisco "Paco" Bonet Serrano (born 27 June 1959) is a Spanish former professional footballer who played as a central defender.

He appeared in 98 La Liga matches over five seasons (one goal), with Real Madrid and Mallorca.

Club career
Born in Almuñecar, Province of Granada, Andalusia, Bonet started his professional career with Elche CF, appearing in three Segunda División seasons with the club and also being loaned to RCD Mallorca during his tenure, being relocated to the city to perform his military service. In 1982 he signed with Real Madrid, making his La Liga debut on 5 September in a 2–2 away draw against Real Valladolid and going on to start in all his 24 appearances during the campaign to help to a second-place finish.

During the 1983 Copa del Rey Final, Bonet suffered a serious injury after a tough tackle from FC Barcelona's Migueli, from which he never fully recovered. Whilst at the Santiago Bernabéu Stadium, he also played eight games in European competitions, seven of them in the UEFA Cup Winners' Cup.

Bonet retired in 1989 at the age of 30, after a couple of top-tier seasons with Mallorca.

International career
Bonet earned four caps for Spain over six months. His first arrived on 27 October 1982, in a 1–0 home win over Iceland for the UEFA Euro 1984 qualifying stage.

Honours
Real Madrid
UEFA Cup: 1984–85

References

External links

Madridista stats 

1959 births
Living people
Spanish footballers
Footballers from Almuñécar
Association football defenders
La Liga players
Segunda División players
Segunda División B players
CD Atlético Baleares footballers
Elche CF players
Palencia CF players
RCD Mallorca players
Real Madrid CF players
Real Madrid Castilla footballers
UEFA Cup winning players
Spain international footballers